MUD Jeans is a denim brand based in the Netherlands that specializes in sustainable and fair trade certified products. The company adheres to the principles of the circular economy and utilizes 40% recycled content in its jeans, with the material sourced from discarded denim. The main business concept of MUD Jeans is to lease its products to consumers for a period of one year, after which they can choose to switch them for another pair and continue leasing, return them for recycling or upcycling, or keep them. This concept, known as Lease A Jeans, was launched in 2013 and includes free unlimited repair services.

History 
The company was re-launched by Bert van Son after acquiring the brand in 2012. Bert van Son had a new vision for the company and decided to invest in MUD Jeans. From May 2016 to August 2018, MUD Jeans was headquartered in Almere, The Netherlands. In September 2018, the "MUDquarters" relocated to Laren, Netherlands at the Groene Afslag.

Lease A Jeans 
The 'Lease A Jeans' concept was launched in 2013. With this concept, MUD Jeans follows a circular economy where the mindset of the consumer changes from owing to using. The concept also promotes the return of the jeans, which will stimulate the recycling process. According to the Ellen MacArthur Foundation, Bert van Son came to notice that in order to promote the return of jeans he has to avoid selling it in the first place.

The consumer can lease a jeans for a period of one year. Around the eleventh month of the consumer's lease contract, MUD Jeans gives the consumer three choices concerning the jeans:  
 Switch the current jeans for another pair and continue leasing the new pair of jeans. The old pair will be recycled or sold as vintage depending on the condition of the jeans.
 Return the jeans without receiving a new pair. The old pair will be recycled or sold as vintage depending on the condition of the jeans.  
 Keep the jeans. After the 12 months of monthly payments, the consumer has paid off the amount of the jeans and are now the owner. As MUD Jeans promotes the philosophy of a circular economy, they discourage this last option in order to recycle jeans.

When old jeans are returned back to the company, a quality check is carried out to determine whether they can be re-used through MUD' s vintage program or if they should be recycled. Once jeans are returned to be recycled, the jeans are sent back to the factory in Valencia, Spain, where the recycling process takes place. The denim fibres are reused in new jeans and sweaters. MUD Jeans currently sells sweaters which contain 85% recycled denim. Anyone can return (non-)MUD Jeans so that they can be recycled.

The Recycle Tour 
In May 2016, MUD Jeans travelled from Amsterdam to Valencia, where one of the factories is located. This road trip was planned to bring jeans back to the factory in order to close the circle. At the starting destination, Amsterdam, and along the way, jeans were collected from individuals who wished their jeans a next life. In Valencia, the MUD Team was able to see the whole recycling process and capture this to share with their followers. This initiative allowed them to bring back 3,000 pairs of jeans. The jeans that are recycled here, will be shredded and woven together with virgin denim into new fabric. The first batch of recycled denim jeans will be available as of fall 2016 and will be made of 20% recycled denim, which is the highest level of recycling that is possible with current technology. Throughout the road trip to Valencia, the MUD Team organised get togethers with other sustainable organisations and individuals, such as a beach clean up in collaboration with the Surfrider Foundation Europe.

Partnerships

RePack 
On 6 June 2016, the first orders using RePackaging were sent to customers. RePack is a Finnish company offering the service of packaging which deliberately reduces the waste created when  sending and returning packages. Packages used by firms can be used up to 20 times and customers and stores are incentivised to use RePack by offering discounts at connected brands.

References 

Clothing companies established in 2012
Clothing companies of the Netherlands
Fair trade brands
Jeans by brand